Knight-errant, a knight who is on a quest or errand
 Knights errant (card game), a form of solitaire